Deng Haiyang (born 15 October 1984 in Kunming, Yunnan) is a Chinese long-distance runner who specializes in the marathon.

He competed at the 2006 Asian Games and the 2007 World Championships. He represented his country at the 2008 Summer Olympics, placing 25th.

Achievements

Personal bests
10,000 metres - 29:07.06 min (2003)
Marathon - 2:10:43 hrs (2008)

References
 
 Team China 2008

1984 births
Athletes (track and field) at the 2008 Summer Olympics
Chinese male long-distance runners
Chinese male marathon runners
Living people
Olympic athletes of China
Sportspeople from Kunming
Runners from Yunnan
Athletes (track and field) at the 2006 Asian Games
Asian Games competitors for China